This article shows the roster of all participating teams for the men's volleyball competition at the 2020 Summer Olympics.

Pool A

Canada
The Canadian roster of 12 athletes was announced on June 30, 2021.

Head coach: Glenn Hoag

1 TJ Sanders 
2 Gord Perrin (C)  
3 Steven Marshall 
4 Nicholas Hoag 
7 Stephen Maar 
9 Jay Blankenau 
10 Ryan Sclater 
12 Lucas Van Berkel 
13 Sharone Vernon-Evans 
17 Graham Vigrass 
19 Blair Bann 
20 Arthur Szwarc

Iran
The roster was announced on 11 July 2021.

Head coach: Vladimir Alekno

2 Milad Ebadipour 
4 Saeid Marouf (C) 
6 Mohammad Mousavi 
9 Masoud Gholami 
10 Amir Ghafour 
11 Saber Kazemi 
12 Morteza Sharifi 
15 Ali Asghar Mojarrad 
17 Meisam Salehi 
19 Mehdi Marandi 
21 Arman Salehi 
24 Javad Karimi

Italy
The Italian roster was announced on 21 June 2021.

Head coach: Gianlorenzo Blengini

2 Jiří Kovář 
4 Luca Vettori 
5 Osmany Juantorena 
6 Simone Giannelli 
9 Ivan Zaytsev (C) 
11 Matteo Piano 
13 Massimo Colaci 
14 Gianluca Galassi 
15 Riccardo Sbertoli 
17 Simone Anzani 
18 Alessandro Michieletto 
19 Daniele Lavia

Japan
The Japanese roster was announced on 21 June 2021.

Head coach: Yuichi Nakagaichi

1 Kunihiro Shimizu 
2 Taishi Onodera 
3 Naonobu Fujii 
6 Akihiro Yamauchi 
11 Yuji Nishida 
12 Masahiro Sekita 
14 Yūki Ishikawa (C) 
15 Haku Ri 
17 Kenta Takanashi 
19 Tatsunori Otsuka 
20 Tomohiro Yamamoto 
21 Ran Takahashi

Poland
The Polish roster was announced on 27 June 2021.

Head coach: Vital Heynen

1 Piotr Nowakowski 
5 Łukasz Kaczmarek 
6 Bartosz Kurek 
9 Wilfredo León 
11 Fabian Drzyzga 
12 Grzegorz Łomacz 
13 Michał Kubiak (C) 
14 Aleksander Śliwka 
15 Jakub Kochanowski 
16 Kamil Semeniuk 
17 Paweł Zatorski 
20 Mateusz Bieniek

Venezuela
The Venezuelan roster was announced on 2 July 2021.

Head coach: Ronald Sarti

1 Armando Velásquez 
3 Fernando González 
4 Héctor Mata 
5 Emerson Rodríguez 
6 Robert Oramas 
7 Edson Valencia 
9 José Carrasco (C) 
11 José Verdi 
14 Eliécer Canelo 
15 Luis Arias 
17 Ronald Fayola 
19 Willner Rivas

Pool B

Argentina
The Argentine roster was announced on 23 June 2021.

Head coach: Marcelo Méndez

1 Matías Sánchez 
2 Federico Pereyra 
6 Cristian Poglajen 
7 Facundo Conte 
8 Agustín Loser 
9 Santiago Danani 
11 Sebastián Solé 
12 Bruno Lima 
13 Ezequiel Palacios 
15 Luciano De Cecco (C) 
17 Nicolás Méndez 
18 Martín Ramos

Brazil
The Brazilian roster was announced on 27 June 2021.

Head coach: Renan Dal Zotto

1 Bruno Rezende (C) 
5 Maurício Borges Silva 
6 Fernando Kreling 
8 Wallace de Souza 
9 Yoandy Leal 
12 Isac Santos 
13 Maurício Souza 
14 Douglas Souza 
16 Lucas Saatkamp 
17 Thales Hoss 
18 Ricardo Lucarelli 
21 Alan Souza

France
The French roster was announced on 18 June 2021.

Head coach: Laurent Tillie

1 Barthélémy Chinenyeze 
2 Jenia Grebennikov 
4 Jean Patry 
6 Benjamin Toniutti (C) 
7 Kevin Tillie 
9 Earvin N'Gapeth 
11 Antoine Brizard 
12 Stephen Boyer 
14 Nicolas Le Goff 
16 Daryl Bultor 
17 Trévor Clévenot 
19 Yacine Louati

ROC
The ROC roster was announced on 1 July 2021.

Head coach: Tuomas Sammelvuo

1 Yaroslav Podlesnykh 
4 Artem Volvich 
7 Dmitry Volkov 
9 Ivan Iakovlev 
10 Denis Bogdan 
11 Pavel Pankov 
15 Viktor Poletaev 
17 Maksim Mikhaylov 
18 Egor Kliuka 
20 Ilyas Kurkaev 
24 Igor Kobzar (C) 
27 Valentin Golubev

Tunisia
The following is the Tunisian roster.

Head coach: Antonio Giacobbe

2 Ahmed Kadhi 
3 Khaled Ben Slimene 
6 Mohamed Ali Ben Othmen Miladi 
7 Elyes Karamosli 
9 Omar Agrebi 
10 Hamza Nagga 
11 Ismaïl Moalla 
12 Mehdi Ben Cheikh 
13 Selim Mbareki 
15 Wassim Ben Tara 
19 Aymen Bouguerra 
20 Saddem Hmissi

United States
The American roster was announced on 14 June 2021.

Head coach: John Speraw

1 Matt Anderson 
3 Taylor Sander 
5 Kyle Ensing 
6 Mitch Stahl 
7 Kawika Shoji 
8 TJ DeFalco 
11 Micah Christenson (C) 
12 Maxwell Holt 
17 Thomas Jaeschke 
18 Garrett Muagututia 
20 David Smith 
22 Erik Shoji

References

Volleyball men
Men's team rosters
2020